Murexsul zylmanae is a species of sea snail, a marine gastropod mollusk in the family Muricidae. More common names are murex snails or rock snails.

References

Muricidae
Gastropods described in 1993